Mastroni is a surname. Notable people with the surname include:

Andrea Mastroni, Italian bass
Leonard Mastroni (1949–2020), American politician and judge